Andrea Daria Khanjin  (born December 27, 1987 in Moscow) is a Canadian politician who was elected to the Legislative Assembly of Ontario since the 2018 general election representing the riding of Barrie-Innisfil. She is the current Parliamentary Assistant to the Minister of Intergovernmental Affairs and has been the longest serving Deputy Government House Leader for the Progressive Conservative Party of Ontario since 2019. She also served as the Deputy Government Whip, and as the Parliamentary Assistant to the Minister of Environment, Conservation and Parks during the 42nd Provincial Parliament.

Politics 
Khanjin ran as the Progressive Conservative Party of Ontario candidate in the 2018 Ontario general election for the riding of Barrie-Innisfil, won with 22,121 votes, and defeated the Liberal incumbent by 16, 576 votes. She was re-elected in 2022 Ontario general election.

Following her election in 2018, during Khanjin's first term, she served as a member of Finance and Economic Affairs, Estimates, and Government Agencies Committees. During this term she also successfully introduced a private member's bill and co-sponsored two other bills. On June 5, 2019, she introduced an Act to proclaim the Provincial Day of Action on Litter as her private member's bill; on March 1, 2020, Khanjin and Cuzzetto introduced an Act to proclaim Sickle Cell Disease Awareness Day and Thalassemia Awareness Day, and; she co-sponsored an Act to proclaim the month of August as Emancipation Month on December 8, 2021. All of these bills proceeded and received Royal Assents.

Provincial Day of Action on Litter 
To raise awareness of the importance to a clean environment of not littering, Andrea Khanjin introduced an Act to proclaim the Provincial Day of Action on Litter every second Tuesday in May in each year as her first private member's bill.

Ontario marks the First Provincial Day of Action on Litter at the Innisfil Beach Park in the Town of Innisfil on May 12, 2020. Ontario is taking action to reduce the amount of waste going to landfills or becoming litter by reducing, diverting, preventing waste and litter.

Sickle Cell Disease Awareness Day and Thalassemia Awareness Day 
On June 3, 2021, Bill 255, Sickle Cell Disease Awareness Day and Thalassemia Awareness Day Act, 2021 of Khanjin and Cuzzetto received royal assent. This bill proclaims that June 19 as Sickle Cell Disease Awareness Day and May 8 as Thalassemia Awareness Day in Ontario would increase awareness of these blood disorders in our province and dedicate a day to support individuals who have sickle cell disease or thalassemia and their families.

Emancipation Month 
Andrea Khanjin co-sponsored Bill 75, Emancipation Month Act, 2021 proclaiming August as Emancipation Month. Ontario pays tribute to the important contributions and leadership that the Black communities have made and continue to make in Ontario as a major part of the vibrant social, economic, political and cultural fabric of our province.

Electoral Record

References 

1987 births
Living people
Progressive Conservative Party of Ontario MPPs
21st-century Canadian politicians
21st-century Canadian women politicians
Women MPPs in Ontario
Jewish Canadian politicians
Canadian people of Russian-Jewish descent
University of Ottawa alumni
Jewish women politicians